No. 46 (Royal Marine) Commando was a battalion size formation of the Royal Marines, part of the British Commandos, formed in August 1943 during the Second World War. The Commando was assigned to the 4th Special Service Brigade and served in North-west Europe and took part in the D-Day landings, as well as operations around Ostend and Antwerp, before being disbanded after the war in January 1946.

Background
The British Commandos were formed in 1940, by the order of Winston Churchill, the British Prime Minister. He called for specially trained troops that would "develop a reign of terror down the enemy coast". At first they were a small force of volunteers who carried out small raids against enemy occupied territory, but by 1943 their role had changed into lightly equipped assault infantry which specialised in spearheading amphibious landings.

The man selected as the overall commander of the force was Admiral Sir Roger Keyes, himself a veteran of the landings at Galipoli and the Zeebrugge raid in the First World War. Initially the Commandos were a British Army formation, the first Royal Marines Commando was formed in 1942. The Royal Marine Commandos, like all British Army Commandos, went through the six-week intensive commando course at Achnacarry. The course in the Scottish Highlands concentrated on fitness, speed marches, weapons training, map reading, climbing, small boat operations and demolitions both by day and by night.

No. 46 (Royal Marine) Commando was formed in August 1943, under the command of Lieutenant Colonel Campbell Hardy as part of the conversion of the Royal Marines Division into commandos. Following training it was allocated to the 1st Special Service Brigade. It took part in the Normandy landings of 6 June 1944, serving on the Orne River bridgehead alongside the British 6th Airborne Division. It suffered heavy casualties in Normandy and at the end of September 1944 was returned to the United Kingdom to refit. Returning to mainland Europe in January 1945 it was the Antwerp guard force. The commando then participated in a number of assault river crossings during the advance into Germany. At the end of the war the commando took part in the occupation of Germany before being disbanded in February 1946.

No. 46 (Royal Marine) Commando was disbanded after the Second World War. The Royal Marine Commando tradition is today continued by 3 Commando Brigade and its units.

Battle honours
The following Battle honours were awarded to the British Commandos during the Second World War.

Adriatic
Alethangyaw
Aller
Anzio
Argenta Gap
Burma 1943–45
Crete
Dieppe
Dives Crossing
Djebel Choucha
Flushing
Greece 1944–45
Italy 1943–45
Kangaw
Landing at Porto San Venere
Landing in Sicily
Leese
Litani
Madagascar
Middle East 1941, 1942, 1944
Monte Ornito
Myebon
Normandy Landing
North Africa 1941–43
North-West Europe 1942, 1944–1945
Norway 1941
Pursuit to Messina
Rhine
St. Nazaire
Salerno
Sedjenane 1
Sicily 1943
Steamroller Farm
Syria 1941
Termoli
Vaagso
Valli di Comacchio
Westkapelle

References
Notes

Bibliography

Military units and formations established in 1943
Military units and formations disestablished in 1946
46
Royal Marine formations and units
1943 establishments in the United Kingdom
1946 disestablishments in the United Kingdom